The 2022–23 FIBA Europe Cup play-offs began on 6 March and will conclude on 19 and 26 April 2023 with the 2023 FIBA Europe Cup Finals, to decide the champions of the 2022–23 FIBA Europe Cup.

Format
A total of eight teams advancing from the second round (four group winners and four runners-up) will compete in the play-offs. The quarter-finals, semi-finals and the finals will be played as two-legged ties, with home and away matches.
Each two-legged tie is considered as one match, meaning that if the first leg ends with a draw, no extra period is played. However, if the aggregate score of both matches is a draw, the second leg will continue to be played with as many 5-minute periods as required to break the tie.

Bracket

Quarter-finals
The first leg games were played on 6–8 March, and the second leg games were played on 14–15 March 2023. The second round group winners had the home advantage in the second leg.

|}

Cholet vs. Budivelnyk

Karhu vs. FC Porto

Gaziantep vs. Anwil Włocławek

Brose Bamberg vs. Kalev/Cramo

Semi-finals
The first leg matches will be played on 29 March 2022, and the second leg matches will be played on 5 April 2023.

|}

Cholet vs. Kalev/Cramo

Karhu vs. Anwil Włocławek

Finals

The first leg will be played on 19 April, and the second leg will be played on 26 April 2023.

|}

References

External links
 

2022–23 FIBA Europe Cup
FIBA Europe Cup Play-offs